Membrane most commonly means a thin, selective barrier, but it is sometimes used for films that function as separators, like biological membranes. Membrane may also refer to:

Biology:
 Isolating tissues formed by layers of cells
 Amnion, a membrane in the amniotic sac
 Basement membrane, a thin sheet of fibers that underlies the epithelium
 Chorioallantoic membrane, a vascular membrane found in eggs of birds, reptiles and other animals
 Eardrum, more formally known as Tympanic membrane
 Fetal membrane, the amnion and chorion which surround and protect a developing fetus
 Mucous membrane, linings of mostly endodermal origin which are involved in absorption and secretion
 Serous membrane, a smooth membrane consisting of a thin layer of cells, which secrete serous fluid
 Tunic membrane, protective membrane covering the testes
 Patagium, also known as "flight membrane", in some flying and gliding animals
 Pterygium, a triangular membrane occurring in eyes
 Cell membranes:
 Plasma membrane, a membrane that separates the interior of all cells from the outside environment
 Inner nuclear membrane, the biological membrane of nucleus
 Outer membrane (disambiguation), several meanings

Other uses:
 Acoustic membrane, a thin vibrating layer that produces sound
 Membranophone, a musical instrument that uses this principle, including most drums
 Membrane keyboard, a computer keyboard whose keys are pressure pads that have only outlines and symbols printed on a flat, flexible surface
 Membrane structure, a sort of spatial structure made of tensioned membranes
 Membrane (M-Theory), a spatially extended mathematical concept that appears in string theory and related theories
 Synthetic membrane, a synthetically created membrane which is usually intended for separation purposes in laboratory or in industry
 The Membranes, a punk band